The Paynes is an American television sitcom that premiered on January 16, 2018, on the Oprah Winfrey Network. The show was created, written, and directed by Tyler Perry and serves as a sequel to his previous series, Tyler Perry's House of Payne.

Though the show was not renewed for a second season, a revival of the original series premiered in 2020 on BET.

Plot
The series begins in Sun Coast, Florida, where Curtis and Ella Payne come to attend the funeral of Curtis' Uncle Robert. Their trip takes an unexpected turn when Ella and Curtis get roped into a real estate deal, landing them in a new community with a new church and unfamiliar family members. The family land straight back into the issues they find in their everyday lives. As life lessons abound, Ella finds a new business, a new home, and a new purpose. On House of Payne season 9 episode 14 "Been A Long Time", this series is officially retconned out of existence as it is revealed that it was all a dream that Curtis had.

Cast and characters

Main
 LaVan Davis as Curtis Payne, Ella's husband and JoAnn's cousin. Without consulting his wife, Curtis sells his old house and buys his late uncle's house and laundromat at his cousin's suggestion, only to find both in ruins.
 Cassi Davis as Ella Payne, Curtis' wife. While Ella is furious at her husband for not consulting her, she soon comes to enjoy the effect of the move and lets her anger go to make a new start.
 Jackée Harry as JoAnn Payne, Curtis' cousin and Ryan's mother, who tricked him into buying his late uncle's dilapidated home as well as a broken-down laundromat in order to make profits for her church.
 Stephanie Charles as Nyla, Kenny and Lynn's mother. A young woman who works with JoAnn at the church. She begins to live with Curtis and Ella after they encounter her in an abusive relationship with her boyfriend Kendrick. She has two young kids, Kenny and Lynn.
 Markice Moore as Ryan Payne, JoAnn's son and Curtis's nephew. He works at the laundromat and was amused when his relatives bought the dump. He often butts heads with Curtis, but comes to see him as family and reaches common ground with him.
 JD McCrary as Kenny, Nyla's son
 Sanai Victoria as Lynn, Nyla's daughter
 Anthony O. Dalton as Terrance, the head contractor whom Ella hires to repair the laundromat
 Matthew Law as Kendrick, Nyla's abusive boyfriend

Guest
 Lance Gross as Calvin Payne, Curtis and Ella's only son
 Allen Payne as Clarence "CJ" Payne Jr., Curtis and Ella's nephew
 Demetria McKinney as Janine Payne, C.J.'s wife
 Larramie "Doc" Shaw as Malik Payne, C.J. and Janine's son
 China Anne McClain as Jazmine Payne, C.J. and Janine's daughter
 Anthony Reynolds as Agent Simms
 Polly W. LePorte as Margaret Davis
 Monique Grant as Homeless Woman

Episodes

Series overview

Season 1 (2018)

References

External links
 

Oprah Winfrey Network original programming
Television series created by Tyler Perry
2018 American television series debuts
2018 American television series endings
American television spin-offs
2010s American black sitcoms
Television shows set in Florida